Rhinella roqueana is a species of toad in the family Bufonidae. It is found in northern Peru, eastern Ecuador (Pastaza), Amazonian Colombia (Amazonas and Caquetá Departments), and adjacent western 
Brazil. Its specific name refers to its type locality, Roque, San Martín Region, Peru. Its taxonomic position is uncertain and it is not clear how to distinguish it from other members in the Rhinella margaritifera group in the area.

Description
Males measure  and females  in snout–vent length.

Habitat and conservation
It is an uncommon species living in the leaf-litter of tropical lowland rainforest. Habitat loss is a localized threat to this widely distributed species. For example, its type locality is mostly coffee plantation today.

References

roqueana
Amphibians of Brazil
Amphibians of Colombia
Amphibians of Ecuador
Amphibians of Peru
Taxonomy articles created by Polbot
Amphibians described in 1941